Events during the year 1932 in  Northern Ireland.

Incumbents
 Governor - 	 The Duke of Abercorn 
 Prime Minister - James Craig

Events
5 July – The Chapel of the Holy Spirit in St Anne's Cathedral, Belfast is dedicated.
3–14 October – Belfast Outdoor Relief Strike, uniting Catholic and Protestant working class communities.
16 November – Edward, Prince of Wales travels to Belfast for the first time to open the new Parliament buildings.
22 November – The new Northern Ireland Parliament Buildings at Stormont are officially opened.

Sport

Football
Irish League
Winners: Linfield

Irish Cup
Winners: Glentoran 2 – 1 Linfield

Births

21 March – Allen McClay, businessman and philanthropist (died 2010).
1 July – Stratton Mills, Ulster Unionist Party and Alliance Party MP.
27 October – Harry Gregg, international football goalkeeper and manager (died 2020).
3 November – John McNally, boxer.
4 November – Tommy Makem, folk musician, artist, poet and storyteller (died 2007).
12 November – Joe Hendron, SDLP MP.
December – Declan Mulholland, actor (died 1999).
Full date unknown – Basil Blackshaw, painter.

Deaths

See also
1932 in Scotland
1932 in Wales

References